Cross-platform play is the ability to allow different gaming platforms to share the same online servers in a game, allowing players to join regardless of the platform they own. Since the Dreamcast and PlayStation 2, there have been online video games that support cross-play. Listed here is an incomplete list of games that support cross-play with their consoles, computers, mobile, and handheld game consoles note when using.

Games which currently support cross-platform play

Discontinued

See also
 Lists of video games

References

Cross-platform play
Cross-platform play